Ak Welsapar (Russian: Ак Вельсапар; born September 19, 1956) is a Swedish-Turkmen journalist and writer. Welsapar writes in Turkmen, Russian and Swedish, and is the author of more than 20 books and his books have come out in many languages. The American journal, The World Literature Today in its review of this book wrote: "Cobra is a must for all specialists of Central Asia and a great read for anyone interested in the psychology of despots." This 
was followed by the release in English of his novel The Tale of Aypi. In 2021, Welsapar being accused, by emerging opposition groups, of working for secret service of Turkmenistan.

Accomplishments 
Welsapar was awarded the Ukrainian literary prize "Triumf" named after Nikolai Gogol for his novel The Emerald Shore (2014).

Bibliography 
 1986 – Sepgit (in Turkmen). Ashgabat: Magaryf, I – 06848 [English title: The First Drop]
 1988 – Gawunkelle (in Turkmen). Ashgabat: Magaryf,  [English title: The Melon Head]
 1990 – Ahal aýak ýeterde (in Turkmen). Ashgabat: Turkmenistan,  [English title: A Long Journey to Nearby]
 1990 – Böwsülen tümlük (in Turkmen). Ashgabat: Sowet edebiyaty, Nr 11–12, ISSN 0205-9975 [English title: This Darkness Is Brighter]
 1991 – Köne halydaky egri gylyç (in Turkmen). Ashgabat: Yashlyk, ISSN 0235-0939 [English title: The Bent Sword on the Old Carpet]
 1992 – Месть рода лисицы (in Russian). Ashgabat: «Ашхабад», ISSN 0320-9342 [English title: The Revenge of the Foxes]
 1994 – Ак аждарханын йориши (in Turkmen). Moscow: Samizdat [English title: The White Dragon's Path]
 1996 – Mülli Tahyryň Hudaýlygy (in Turkmen). Lulea: Grafiska Huset [English title: Mulli Tahir]
 1996 – Ak öý (in Turkmen). Lulea: Grafiska Huset [English title: The Round House]
 1998 – Det nya landet. Grönt te (in Swedish). Goteborg: Lindelöws Publishing,  [English title: The New Country]
 2000 – Syrenkärlek (in Swedish). Translated by Lars Erik Blomqvist, Stockholm: 00-Tal, ISSN 1404-1197, Nr 2-3 [original title: Любовь сиреневого цвета]
 2002 – Kepjebaş (in Turkmen). Stockholm: Författares Bokmashin,  [English title: Cobra]
 2002 – Şor iňrik (in Turkmen). Stockholm: Gün Publishing House,  [English title: The Salty Twilight]
 2012 – Halkyň haky (in Turkmen). Stockholm: Gün Publishing House,  [English title: People's share]
 2005 – Кобра (in Russian). Tula: Селена,  [English title: Cobra]
 2005 – Watanym galdy (in Turkmen). Stockholm: Gün Publishing House, 2005;  [English title: Longing for Another Sky]
 2006 – Ak guş bolup uçsamdym! (in Turkmen). Stockholm: Gün Publishing House,  [English title: If I Only Were a White Bird]
 2008 – Ene dilim – öz öýüm (in Turkmen). Stockholm: Gün Publishing House [English title: My Native Language – My Home]
 2009 – Ýagtylykda ýitenler (in Turkmen). Stockholm: Gün Publishing House,  [English title: The Ones Vanishing in the Daylight]
 2011 - Kobra (in Swedish). Trnaslated by Stefan Lindgren, Stockholm: Tranan Publishing House [English title: Cobra]
 2011 – Skapandet: talang och erfarenhet. I språkets hus (in Swedish). Uppsala: Kultur i Länet,  [English title: Creation: The Talent and Experience]
 2012 – Сомнений вечных боль (in Russian). Translated by V. Kudryavcev, Vologda: Книжное наследие,  [English title: The Pain of Eternal Uncertainties]
 2013 – Den underbara sångens hem (in Swedish). Stockholm: Gün Publishing House,  [English title: Home of the Wonderful Song]
 2013 – Речной конь Дюль-Дюль (in Russian). Stockholm: Gün Publishing House,  [English title: Seahorse Dul-Dul]
 2014 – Смарагдовий берег (in Ukrainian). Translated by Сергій Дзюба, Чернівці: Букрек,  [English title: The Emerald Shore]
 2015 – Legenden om Aypi (in Swedish). Translated by Mats Müllern, Stockholm: Tranan Publishing House,  [English title: The Tale of Aypi]
 2015 - Love History (in English). Translated by Youssef Azemoun, London: The Magazin Xindex on Censorship, Nr 2, -0 [original title: Söýgi hekaýaty]
 2015 - У оврага за последними домами/ Gorpuň gyrasynda (in Russian and Turkmen). Stockholm: Gün Publishing House,  [English title: On the Edge]
 2015 - Poesi för världen samman. Lyfta locket av Uppsala (in Swedish). Uppsala: Litteraturcentrum,  [English title: Poetry unites the World]
 2016 - The Tale of Aypi (in English). Translated by W.M. Coulson, London: Glagoslav Publication,  [original title: Aýpi hakynda rowaýat]
 2018 - Death of the Snake Catcher (in English). Short Stories. Translated by Lois Kapila, Youssef Azemoun, and Richard Govett, London: Glagoslav Publication, 
2018 - The Revenge of the Foxes (in English). Novel. Translated by Richard Govett. London: Glagoslav Publication,

References

External links 
 Ak Welspar in "World literature" (In Swedish)
 Ak Welsapar in Libris
 "The Tale of Aypi" by Ak Welsapar in Glagoslav Publications
 Ak Welsapar in Tranan Publishing House
 Ak Welsapar in Gün Publishing House
 Ak Welsapar's Website

1956 births
Living people
Soviet male writers
Turkmenistan journalists
20th-century Turkmenistan writers
21st-century Turkmenistan writers
20th-century male writers
21st-century male writers
People from Mary, Turkmenistan
Turkmenistan emigrants to Sweden